The Healthy Eating Pyramid (alternately, Healthy Eating Plate) is a nutrition guide developed by the Harvard School of Public Health, suggesting quantities of each food category that a human should eat each day. The healthy eating pyramid is intended to provide a more sound eating guide than the widespread food guide pyramid created by the USDA.

The new pyramid aims to include more recent research in dietary health not present in the USDA's 1992 guide. The original USDA pyramid has been criticized for not differentiating between refined grains and whole grains, between saturated fats and unsaturated fats, and for not placing enough emphasis on exercise and weight control.

Food groups 

In general terms, the healthy eating pyramid recommends the following intake of different food groups each day, although exact amounts of calorie intake depends on sex, age, and lifestyle:
 Vegetables, in abundance 3 or more each day; each serving = .
 1–3 servings of nuts, or legumes; each serving = .
 1–2 servings of poultry, fish, or eggs; each serving =  or 1 egg.
 Sparing use of white rice, white bread, potatoes, pasta and sweets;
 Sparing use of red meat and butter.

See also 
 5 A Day
 Dietary supplement
 Dieting
 List of diets
 Essential nutrient
 Food and Nutrition Service
 Food pyramid (nutrition)
 Functional food
 Health food restaurants
 Healthy diet
 Human nutrition
 MyPlate
 Nutrition education
 Orthorexia nervosa (an obsession with healthy eating)

References

Nutritional advice pyramids